Kirsten Flipkens and Johanna Larsson were the defending champions. Larsson chose not to participate and Flipkens was scheduled to play alongside Alison Van Uytvanck, but withdrew due to a wrist injury.

Barbora Krejčíková and Kateřina Siniaková won the title, defeating Barbara Haas and Xenia Knoll in the final, 6–4, 6–3.

Seeds

Draw

Draw

References
 Main Draw

Upper Austria Ladies Linz - Doubles
Upper Austria Ladies Linz Doubles